Sawant is a surname of Maratha Caste

Notable people 
People with this surname include:
 
 
Abhijeet Sawant, singer
Arvind Sawant, Ministry of Heavy Industries and Public Enterprises
Ashlesha Sawant (born 24 September 1972), Indian television actress 
Deepak Sawant, politician
Govind Sawant, field hockey player
Kamlesh Sawant, actor
Kshama Sawant, U.S. economics professor and politician
Kunal Sawant, football goalkeeper
Nirmiti Sawant, actress
P. B. Sawant, Indian Supreme Court judge
Pandharinath Sawant, journalist
Pooja Sawant, actress
Prajakta Sawant, badminton player
Pramod Sawant, Chief Minister of Goa
Rakhi Sawant, Indian film actress, talk show host
Shivaji Sawant, writer
Sudhir Sawant, politician, lawyer and brigadier in Indian Army
Tejaswini Sawant, shooter
Trupti Sawant, politician
Vishram Sawant, author

See also
 Maratha
 Maratha Empire
 Maratha clan system
 Bhonsle
 List of Maratha dynasties and states
 Sawantwadi

References

External links
 Siva Chhatrapati 
 The castes and tribes of H.E.H. the Nizam's dominions

Maratha clans